Patrick Curran (born 1956) was Archdeacon of the Eastern Archdeaconry from 2001 to 2015.

Curran was educated at the University of King's College, the University of Southampton and ordained after a period of study at Chichester Theological College in 1985. He has served the Anglican Church in Heavitree, Bradford, Bonn, Vienna and Valletta.

Notes

Archdeacons of the Eastern Archdeaconry
21st-century English Anglican priests
20th-century English Anglican priests
University of King's College alumni
Alumni of the University of Southampton
Alumni of Chichester Theological College
1956 births
Living people